Dobrinje may refer to:

 Dobrinje, Visoko, Bosnia and Herzegovina
 Dobrinje, Montenegro
 Dobrinje (Tutin), Serbia
 Dobrinje, or Krivaja, a monastery associated with the Church of the Transfiguration, Krivaja, Šabac, Serbia

See also 
 Dobrinja (disambiguation)